Whirlybirds (sometimes called The Whirlybirds or Copter Patrol) is a syndicated American drama/adventure television series, which aired for 111 episodes — broadcast from February 4, 1957, through January 18, 1960. It was produced by Desilu Studios.

Plot synopsis
The program features the exploits of Chuck Martin (Kenneth Tobey) and Pete "P. T." Moore (Craig Hill), owners of a fictitious helicopter chartering company, Whirlybirds, Inc., in the Western United States. Martin and Moore sell their services to various clients at the fictional airport Longwood Field.

The Whirlybirds series was, like I Love Lucy , The Untouchables,and later Star Trek, a product of Desilu Studios.  One particular episode of I Love Lucy, Number 140, became pivotal to the Bell 47's public image as the definitive light helicopter of the 1950s.  In No. 140, titled "Bon Voyage" and first aired on CBS on January 16, 1956, Lucy Ricardo misses the sailing of her trans-Atlantic ocean liner and commandeers a friendly pilot of a Bell 47G to fly her to the ship; Jack Albertson guest stars in this episode. Down she goes on the hoist, in a studio sequence carefully staged using a 47G cabin mockup. Desilu Studios, intrigued by the Bell 47 and its manufacturer, began discussions with Bell Aircraft about how the entertainment potential of the Bell 47 might be further developed for a television audience. The result of this collaboration became The Whirlybirds.

Tobey and Hill did not fly the helicopters on the show. That task was handled by professional helicopter pilots Ed Fuderich, Bob Gilbreath, and Harry Hauss of National Helicopter Service, Inc.

After production of the series ended, Kenneth Tobey reprised his role as Chuck Martin in episode #223 of the long-running television series, Lassie. Titled "The Rescue", the Lassie episode was broadcast on October 2, 1960. Chuck Martin uses a Bell 47G to rescue a trapped Timmy Martin (Jon Provost).

Production notes
The series was originally supposed to air on CBS, but was instead put into syndication by CBS Films.  Series filming started in 1956.

The first four episodes were titled The Whirlybirds and the rest  simply Whirlybirds. Many episodes were directed by Harve Foster and Robert Altman. The creators were Art Napoleon and Jo Napoleon. Assistant Directors Bruce Bilson and Sid Sidman handle 2nd unit filming.

The series was filmed on location in California.  The production first used the Santa Susanna Airport in Simi Valley. The airport, no longer in existence, was near the Iverson Movie Ranch, a dude ranch used to film westerns. Later episodes were filmed at the San Fernando Airport, which is also now closed. 
Much of the open area seen around both airports in the series has since been developed.

Helicopters used
The two helicopter types used were Bell models, a 47G and a 47J Ranger; the tail numbers were N975B and N2838B (and N1538B as back-up), respectively. In reality, many helicopters played the role of N975B. Other Bell 47Gs owned by National Helicopter Service were used in the filming with "N975B" decals covering their actual registrations.

Cast
Kenneth Tobey as Chuck Martin
Craig Hill as P.T. Moore
Nancy Hale as Helen Carter
Sandra Spence as Janet Culver (season 1)

Recurring 
Raymond Bailey as Mr. Culver (season 1)
Jimmy Baird as Tommy Fuller

Guest stars

Charles Aidman
Jeanne Bates
Edward Binns
Whit Bissell
Edgar Buchanan
Johnny Crawford
Mike Connors
Walter Coy 
Francis De Sales 
Ann Doran
Donna Douglas
Bill Erwin
Frank Ferguson
Bruce Gordon
Dabbs Greer
Ron Hagerthy
Stacy Harris
Darryl Hickman

Connie Hines
June Kenney
Brett King 
Gail Kobe
Robert Vaughn,
Ethel Waters
Tyler McVey 
Joyce Meadows 
John M. Pickard
Paul Richards
James Seay
Arthur Space
Fay Spain 
Gary Vinson
Werner Klemperer - Ep. 17
Gavin MacLeod - Ep.61 & 67
Ed Platt - Ep.8
Claude Akins - Ep.5

Episodes status
No officially authorized DVD sets are available. The U.S. National Archives possesses a complete set of original 16 mm prints. The original 35mm film prints of the series are no longer available; unfortunately, extant video copies are inferior with poor contrast/low-resolution images, some emulsion scratches, and with 16mm projector film-gate dirt visible in the frame corners. Considering the many generations of dubs made of this series, the soundtracks of most episodes remain in relative high fidelity.

Syndication
After production of Whirlybirds ended, CBS returned 39 of the 111 episodes to syndication and retitled the series, Copter Patrol.

International airings
In the United Kingdom, it was shown by the BBC in the late 1950s and early 1960s and repeated in the 1970s and 1980s. In Italy, RAI dubbed many episodes in the early 1960s with the title Avventure in elicottero. It was broadcast in Japan in the early 1960s sponsored by Sony electronics and featured a Japanese-registered Bell 47J with "Sony" on the doors in a special introduction.

Episodes list

Season 1: 1957

Season 2: 1958–59

Season 3: 1959–60

References 

 The New Whirlybirds & Tribute Details of program.
 McNeil, Alex (1984). Total Television — A Comprehensive Guide to Programming from 1984 to the Present. p. 712. Penguin Books (New York City).  .

External links 
 
  Classic TV Archive Plot Summaries

1957 American television series debuts
1960 American television series endings
1950s American drama television series
1960s American drama television series
American adventure television series
Aviation television series
Black-and-white American television shows
English-language television shows
Fictional helicopters
Television series by CBS Studios
Television shows filmed in California
Television series by Desilu Productions
Television shows set in the Western United States